The Ringworld series is a series of science fiction novels written by American author Larry Niven. It is part of his Known Space set of stories. Its backdrop is the Ringworld, a giant artifact 600 million miles in circumference around a star. The series is composed of five standalone science fiction novels, the original award-winning book and its four sequels:

 1970: Ringworld
 1980: The Ringworld Engineers
 1996: The Ringworld Throne
 2004: Ringworld's Children
 2012: Fate of Worlds (by Niven and Edward M. Lerner)

Fate of Worlds is also a sequel to the four books of the Fleet of Worlds series, set in the same "Known Space"  universe and all written by Niven and Edward M. Lerner:

 2007: Fleet of Worlds 
 2008: Juggler of Worlds
 2009: Destroyer of Worlds
 2010: Betrayer of Worlds

Known Space
Science fiction book series
Fiction set in the 29th century